Arthur Bentley may refer to:

 Arthur F. Bentley (1870–1957), American political scientist and philosopher
 Arthur Bentley (footballer) (1871–?), English footballer